The Bird Seller is a 1935 German musical comedy film directed by E. W. Emo and starring Maria Andergast, Wolf Albach-Retty, and Lil Dagover. It is an operetta film, based on the work of the same name by Carl Zeller.

Cast

See also
Roses in Tyrol (1940)
The Bird Seller (1953)
Die Christel von der Post (1956)
The Bird Seller (1962)

References

External links

1935 musical comedy films
1930s historical comedy films
German musical comedy films
German historical comedy films
Films of Nazi Germany
Films directed by E. W. Emo
Operetta films
Films based on operettas
Tobis Film films
German black-and-white films
1930s historical musical films
German historical musical films
1930s German films